The Statenvertaling (States Translation) or Statenbijbel (States Bible) was the first translation of the  Bible from the original Hebrew, Aramaic and Greek languages into Dutch, ordered by the Synod of Dordrecht 1618 and financed by government of the Protestant Dutch Republic and first published in 1637.

The first complete Dutch Bible had been printed in Antwerp in 1526 by Jacob van Liesvelt.  Like other existing Dutch Bibles, however, it was merely a translation of other translations.  Furthermore, the translation from Martin Luther was widely used, but it had a Lutheran interpretation. At the Synod of Dort in 1618/19, it was therefore deemed necessary to have a new translation accurately based on the original languages. The synod requested the States General of the Netherlands to commission it.

Guidelines 
The Statenvertaling was written with specific guidelines for translation established by the synod during its 8th session on November 20, 1618. The four main instructions to the translators were:

That they always carefully adhere to the original text, and that the manner of writing of the original languages be preserved, as much as the clarity and properties of Dutch speech permit. But in case where the Hebrew or Greek manner of speech was harder than could remain in the text, that they note this in the margin.
That they add as few words as possible to complete the meaning of a sentence if it is not expressed fully, and that these words be distinguished from the text with a different font and placed between brackets.
That they formulate a short and clear summary for each book and chapter and write this in the margin at the respective locations in the Holy Scriptures.
That they add a brief explanation providing insight to the translation of unclear passages; but the addition of lessons learned is neither necessary nor advisable.

Apocryphal books 
Regarding the Biblical apocrypha, the synod decided to translate these books but not to make them part of the canon. They were placed after the books of the New Testament and preceded with a "warning for the reader".

Translation of God's name 
In the Hebrew Bible, God's name is written with the four consonants JHWH (as seen on the very top of the title page in Hebrew characters), and would not be pronounced by the Jews. During the 12th session, the synod decided to translate God's name with "HEERE" ("LORD"). In the margin where God's name first appears, the following note is given:

Influence 
The 1657 English Version owed itself to the close contact between the Puritans in Holland and England. In 1646 the House of Lords in England commissioned Theodore Haak (1605-1690) a respected German polyglot and academic to begin work on an English translation of the Statenvertaling met Aantekeningen – the Dutch State Bible. There is a suggestion that the Westminster Assembly initiated the project in 1645, but there is no evidence that the Westminster Assembly discussed the matter in that year. Charles Spurgeon, a Calvinist Baptist, wrote: "Haak's Annotations come to us as the offspring of the famous Synod of Dort, and the Westminster Annotations as the production of a still more venerable assembly; but if, with my hat off, bowing profoundly to those august conclaves of master minds, I may venture to say so, I would observe that they furnish another instance that committees seldom equal the labors of individuals. The notes are too short and fragmentary to be of any great value. The volumes are a heavy investment."

References

External links 

Statenvertaling.net
Statenvertaling (pdf)
 Original Statenvertaling from 1637 in JPEG format with transcription from the Dutch Bible Society
 Original Statenvertaling 1637, digital edition
 Original Statenvertaling 1637, digital edition
Statenvertaling

17th-century Dutch books
Synod of Dort
Early printed Bibles
1637 works
Bible versions and translations
Bible translations into Dutch